Ande or Morouas (Moruas) is an Oceanic language spoken in central Espiritu Santo Island in Vanuatu.

References

Espiritu Santo languages
Languages of Vanuatu